Sir Alexander Ramsay, 3rd Baronet (26 May 1813 - 3 March 1875) was a Conservative Party politician.

Family
Baptised at Fettercairn, Kincardineshire in 1813, Ramsay was the son of his namesake Sir Alexander Ramsay, 2nd Baronet and Jane née Russell. He married Ellen Matilda Entwisle, daughter of John Smith Entwisle, in 1835 and they had five children: Ellen Augusta, Alexander Entwisle (1837–1902); Hugh Francis (1838–1890); John (1843–1913); and Bertin (1850–1907).

Parliamentary career
After contesting the seat unsuccessfully in both 1837 and 1852, Ramsay was elected Conservative MP for Rochdale at the 1857 general election, gaining the seat from the Radical Edward Miall. However, he did not attempt to retain the seat at the next election in 1859.

Baronetage
Ramsay became the 3rd Baronet of Balmain upon his father's death in 1852. Upon his own death in 1875, the title was passed to his son Alexander Entwisle.

References

External links
 

Conservative Party (UK) MPs for English constituencies
UK MPs 1857–1859
Baronets in the Baronetage of the United Kingdom
1813 births
1875 deaths
Members of the Parliament of the United Kingdom for Rochdale